Sleepers Awake is a progressive metal band formed in 2005 and is based in Columbus, Ohio.

History
In 2005, friends Rob Bradley and Chris Thompson created Sleepers Awake.  Soon after, Rob's brother Joey Bradley joined the band as their bass guitar player.  Soon after the band's first drummer, Eric Grey joined Sleepers Awake, they recorded their first EP album called Werdegang which was released in 2006.  Soon after, Eric Grey was replaced by drummer Chris Burnsides formerly of Unknown Origin and One Eye Witness. In 2009, the band released their second album called Priests of Fire and soon after went on a 5 city tour with 11 concerts. In 2012, the band released the album Transcension.

Transcension was received favorable reviews.  Punk Prospect gave the album a 10 out of 10 and called the album, "An absolute masterpiece from start to finish". Violence Online gave the album a 6 out of 6, saying, "I am very careful in issuing the highest marks in the evaluation of albums in the pages of this site, but when I have to deal with such a work as "Transcension" by Sleepers Awake, I can not do otherwise. So far it's one of my two candidates for the title of Album of the Year, if not indeed the absolute number one."

Style and influences
Sleepers Awake is a self described progressive rock band. A music critic described them as a heavier, chunkier Dream Theater. The band is said to be influenced by Mastodon, Rush, Queen, Pink Floyd, Opeth, Tool, and Queens of the Stone Age. PowerMetal gave the album (which album?) a 9 out of 10, saying, "Sleepers Awake touches.  And with every note, to be sure. Rarely have I heard an album that every song comes with such drama."

Band members

Current members
Chris Thompson - lead vocals, rhythm guitar (2005 – present)
Rob Bradley - lead guitar (2005 – present)
Kedar Hiremath - bass guitar (2010 – present)
Chris Burnsides - drums, percussion (2008 – present)

Former members
Dan Bilbrey - drums, percussion (2005–2005)
Eric Grey - drums, percussion (2005–2008)
Joey Bradley - bass guitar (2005–2010)

Discography
Studio albums
 Werdegäng (2006)
 Priests of the Fire (2009)
 Transcension (2012)

References

External links

Facebook Page

Musical groups from Columbus, Ohio
Musical groups established in 2005
Musical quartets
American progressive rock groups